WISE 1541−2250 (full designation WISEPA J154151.66−225025.2) is a sub-brown or brown dwarf of spectral class Y0.5, located in the constellation Libra at approximately 18.6 light-years from Earth. This object received popular attention when its discovery was announced in 2011 at a distance estimated to be only about 9 light-years, which would have made it the closest brown dwarf known. (For really close brown dwarfs see, for example, Luhman 16, WISE 1506+7027, Epsilon Indi Ba, Bb, or UGPS 0722-05). It is not the farthest known Y-type brown dwarf to Earth.

History of observations

Discovery
WISE 1541−2250 was discovered in 2011 from data collected by the Wide-field Infrared Survey Explorer (WISE) in the infrared at a wavelength of 40 cm (16 in), whose mission lasted from December 2009 to February 2011. WISE 1541−2250 has two discovery papers: Kirkpatrick et al. (2011) and Cushing et al. (2011) with mostly the same authors and published nearly simultaneously.
 Kirkpatrick et al. presented the discovery of 98 brown dwarf systems with components of spectral types M, L, T and Y, among which was WISE 1541−2250.
 Cushing et al. presented the discovery of seven brown dwarfs, one of the T9.5 type and six of the Y-type, the first members of the Y spectral class discovered and spectroscopically confirmed, including an "archetypal member" of the Y spectral class, WISE 1828+2650, and WISE 1541−2250. These seven objects are also the faintest seven of 98 brown dwarfs presented in Kirkpatrick et al. (2011).

Distance
Currently the most accurate distance estimate of WISE 1541−2250 is a trigonometric parallax, published in 2014 by Tinney et al.: 0.1751 ± 0.0044 arcsec, corresponding to a distance 5.71 pc, or 18.6 ± 0.5 ly.

For several months after its discovery, before the publication of its parallax by Kirkpatrick et al. in 2012, WISE 1541−2250 was considered to be the nearest known brown dwarf at approximately 9 light-years from the Sun, and the seventh-nearest of all star systems, at slightly more than twice the distance of the nearest known star system Alpha Centauri. This view existed because of a very rough preliminary parallax with a baseline of 1.2 years, published in the discovery paper: 0.351 ± 0.108 arcsec, corresponding to a distance 2.8 pc, or 9.3 ly. Also, there were other estimates: spectrophotometric distance estimate 8.2 pc (26.7 ly), and photometric distance estimate 1.8 pc (5.9 ly).

Space motion
WISE 1541−2250 has proper motion of about 899 milliarcseconds per year.

Spectral class and temperature

WISE 1541−2250 is among the first known examples of a Y-class brown dwarf, the coldest spectral class of stars, and has temperature about 350 K (about 77 °C / 170 °F). Its spectral class is Y0.5 (initially was estimated as Y0).

See also
The other six discoveries of brown dwarfs, published in Cushing et al. (2011):
 WISE 0148−7202 (T9.5)
 WISE 0410+1502 (Y0)
 WISE 1405+5534 (Y0 (pec?))
 WISE 1738+2732 (Y0)
 WISE 1828+2650 (≥Y2)
 WISE 2056+1459 (Y0)
Lists:
 List of brown dwarfs
 List of nearest stars

Notes

References

External links
 
 NASA news release
 Science news
 Solstation.com (New Objects within 20 light-years)

Brown dwarfs
Y-type stars
Libra (constellation)
20110823
WISE objects